Donald P. Zingale was the 11th president of the State University of New York at Cobleskill.

Early life and education
Zingale grew up in Brooklyn and earned his B.S. degree from Brooklyn College in  1967. He earned his master's degree in physical education from the University of Massachusetts Amherst in 1969 and his Ph.D. in physical education from Ohio State University in 1973. In 1984 he earned a master's degree in social work.

Career
Zingle joined the faculty at California State University, Sacramento. In 2004 he became vice president of academic affairs at the California Maritime Academy, and in 2008 he became president of the State University of New York at Cobleskill.

References

Living people
Brooklyn College alumni
Ohio State University College of Education and Human Ecology alumni
University of Massachusetts Amherst College of Education alumni
Presidents of campuses of the State University of New York
Year of birth missing (living people)